Aaron Sachs (July 4, 1923 – June 5, 2014) was an American jazz saxophone and clarinet player.

Career
A native of New York City, Sachs began his music career as a young swing protégé of Benny Goodman, and later eased into bebop music, also playing with Earl Hines. He then formed his own bands, recording and touring. He married singer Helen Merrill in 1948, a union which lasted only a few years. Their only child was Allan Preston Sachs, later known professionally as Alan Merrill.

In the 1960s, Aaron Sachs worked in Latin bands with Machito, Tito Puente, and Tito Rodríguez. He wrote the hit song "El Mundo De Las Locas" for Rodríguez. He worked with Stan Getz, Sarah Vaughan, Chet Baker, Billie Holiday, Red Norvo, Gene Krupa, Anita O'Day, and Cozy Cole. He died in New York City on June 5, 2014, at the age of 90.

Discography

As leader
 Quintette (Bethlehem, 1955)
 Clarinet and Co. (Rama, 1957)

As sideman
 Louie Bellson, The Brilliant Bellson Sound (Verve, 1959)
 Earl Hines, Varieties! (Xanadu, 1985)
 Gene Krupa, Drummer Man Gene Krupa in Highest Fi (Verve, 1956)
 John Lewis, The Modern Jazz Society Presents a Concert of Contemporary Music (Norgran, 1956)
 Machito, World's Greatest Latin Band (GNP Crescendo, 1962)
 Shelly Manne, Shelly Manne & Co. (Contact, 1965)
 Specs Powell, Movin' In (Roulette, 1957)
 Tom Talbert, Bix Duke Fats (Atlantic, 1957)
 Red Norvo and His Orchestra, Town Hall Jazz Concert 1945  (Atlantic, 1973; re-issue of Commodore original)

References

1923 births
2014 deaths
Musicians from New York City
Bebop clarinetists
Bebop saxophonists
American jazz clarinetists
American jazz saxophonists
American male saxophonists
American male jazz musicians
Jazz musicians from New York (state)
20th-century American saxophonists